The Middelburgsche Commercie Compagnie (MCC) was a Dutch trading company established in 1720 in the Zeeland capital of Middelburg, Netherlands. It was initially called the Commercial Company of the city of Middelburg. However, after the archive industry was published in 1950, it became known as the Middelburg Commercial Company. After the monopoly of the Dutch West India Company for the Atlantic slave trade was abolished in 1730, the MCC became the principal Dutch slave trading company. The company was eventually liquidated in 1889.

Thanks to the well-preserved notes and documents of the company, the MCC archives have proved very useful to scholars in understanding and reconstructing Dutch 18th-century slave trade. The archive was listed in 2011 in UNESCO's Memory of the World Register. Moreover, access to many materials can be found in the Zeeuwse Archief in Middelburg.

See also

 List of trading companies

Citations

References
 

Companies disestablished in 1889
Trading companies of the Dutch Republic
Dutch slave trade
Companies established in 1720
1889 disestablishments
Companies based in Zeeland
1720 establishments in the Dutch Republic